A Bible dictionary is a reference work containing encyclopedic entries related to the Bible, typically concerning people, places, customs, doctrine and Biblical criticism. Bible dictionaries can be scholarly or popular in tone.

The first dictionary of the Bible in English was the Christian Dictionarie (1612) of Thomas Wilson.

Bible dictionaries of the 18th century

Bible dictionaries of the 19th century

Bible dictionaries of the 20th century

Barnes's Bible Encyclopedia, Biographical, Geographical, Historical and Doctrinal (1903), edited by Charles Randall Barnes
Standard Bible Dictionary (1909), edited by Melancthon Williams Jacobus, Jr.
Temple Dictionary of the Bible (1910), edited by William Ewing and John Ebenezer Honeyman Thomson
Universal Bible Dictionary (1914), edited by Augustus Robert Buckland and Arthur Lukyn Williams
International Standard Bible Encyclopedia (1915), edited by James Orr
A New Comprehensive Dictionary of the Bible (1922), edited by Selah Merrill
The Popular and Critical Bible Encyclopaedia and Scriptural Dictionary (1922), edited by Samuel Fallows
 Theological Word Book of the Bible (1951), edited by Alan Richardson
 Harper's Bible Dictionary (1952), edited by Madeleine S. and J. Lane Miller 
 The New Bible Dictionary (1962), edited by J. D. Douglas, (Second Edition 1982, Third Edition 1996)
 Dictionary of the Bible (1965), edited by John L. McKenzie, SJ
 The New Westminster Dictionary of the Bible (1970), edited by Henry Snyder Gehman
 LDS Bible Dictionary (1979)
 Harper's Bible Dictionary (1985), edited by Paul J. Achtemeier
 The Eerdmans Bible Dictionary (1987), edited by Allen C. Myers
 Anchor Bible Dictionary (1992)
 Oxford Dictionary of the Bible (1996), by W. R. F. Browning, (2nd Edition 2009)

Bible dictionaries of the 21st century
New Interpreter's Dictionary of the Bible (2008)

See also
Bibliography of encyclopedias: religion

References
Dictionaries, article by E. C. Richardson in The International standard Bible encyclopaedia (Volume 2) (1915) pp. 844–8; archive.org.

Notes

Lists of books about religion